Aaron James Eshuis is an American songwriter and recordproducer, originally from Kalamazoo, Michigan, United States. Eshuis moved to Nashville, Tennessee, and later signed a worldwide publishing deal  with SMACKSongs in 2017. Eshuis has earned cuts with Rascal Flatts, Joe Nichols, A Thousand Horses, Kid Rock, Cole Swindell, and Scotty McCreery. Eshuis had his first No. 1 hit with Scotty McCreery's "This Is It" in late 2018.  In addition to writing, Eshuis has continued to hone his production craft, working on Ryan Hurd's debut EP and McCreery's album, Seasons Change, which debuted at No. 1 on Billboard’s Top Country Albums Chart.

Songwriting discography

Producer 

Eshuis has produced the following works:

References

External links 
 Aaron Eshuis | Credits | AllMusic

Songwriters from Michigan
Record producers from Michigan